Victor Bodiu (born 27 March 1971) is a Moldovan economist. Since 2001 he was working with Austrian Raiffeisen banking group for more than 8 years.

Biography 

Victor Bodiu was born on 27 March 1971 in Chişinău. He holds a degree in Banking and Finance and a degree in Physics and Engineering.

Since September 2001 till September 2009, he was employed with Raiffeisen, having worked in different locations - Austria, Romania, and Moldova. 
Until late 2005 Victor Bodiu has been involved in multiple transnational deals involving investment promotion activities in East-European Countries (Austria, Poland, Romania, Moldova). His major task, however, involved the management of Raiffeisen Investment activities in Romania and Moldova. 
Assisting strategic partners in their investment activities in Moldova, Romania, Poland in form of Direct Investment, Mergers and Acquisitions, privatizations, partnership and relationship building.
Major sectors covered: infrastructure, pharmaceuticals, food&beverages, heavy industry, telecom, energy, financial services, retail. With a team of 25 highly qualified specialists, Victor Bodiu managed over 20 projects with a combined portfolio of more than 800 mil. EUR. 
Till this date, he was also in charge of planning the Raiffeisen Group entry to the Moldovan market; further planning and strategy development. 
As of January 2006 Victor Bodiu is full-time based in Moldova, as Managing Director of Raiffeisen Leasing Moldova (officially founded in December 2007). In two years the company became number three in overall local leasing market, number two as corporate financing and number one in equipment financing, with a turnover of more than 50 mio MDL. As of 2009 Raiffeisen Leasing built a portfolio of 90 mio MDL, with a strong client base of almost 200 corporate and private clients. Raiffeisen Leasing portfolio is also the healthiest portfolio among other market players, with a Non Performance Loans rate of less than 5% (very important in the crisis period).
Since September 2009 until December 2014 he was Secretary General of the Government of Moldova / Head of State Chancellery of the Moldovan Government.

His early career involved multiple local and international consulting assignments with PriceWaterhouse LLP, Carana Corporation (USA) and IBTCI (USA consulting firm) for the Governments of Ukraine and Moldova on privatization issues, development of securities markets, stock exchange procedures, portfolio management, capital rising, financial markets, licensing procedures and taxation, export promotion and investment attraction.

External links  
 Victor Bodiu's intervention at the United Nations - Millennium Development Goals Summit, September 2010
 Victor Bodiu, ro

References

Living people
1971 births
Businesspeople from Chișinău
21st-century Moldovan economists
Moldova State University alumni
Recipients of the Order of Work Glory